The Lewis Flyer newspaper is the official student publication of Lewis University.  The Lewis Flyer newspaper is owned and published by Lewis University.  Lewis University is a private Roman Catholic and Lasallian university with an enrollment around 5,200 students.

As a student publication, The Lewis Flyer newspaper's purpose is to provide a learning laboratory for students to practice journalistic skills in the Lewis University Communication Department Journalism program.  The student newspaper is published bi-monthly.

History
The college newspaper was founded in 1933, although it was then called The Propeller. The Propeller was published until 1936, when lack of funds stopped the publishing of the newspaper. This lasted until 1947. During World War II the school was being used to train pilots. When a newspaper was published again in 1947, it did not have an official name.

In October 1947, however, the revived paper was named The Shield. This name lasted until 1966. The Shield was named after the founder, Bishop Bernard J. Sheil. The school paper shortened its name to Shield in 1966, and published the paper in a magazine format. In 1969, the newspaper went through another name change, this time calling itself Nexus. This name lasted from 1969 to 1977.
 
On January 31, 1978, the first volume of The Flyer was published. That name has been in place for the past 38 years.

Awards

 Review Writing (2nd place) –  Best of the Midwest College Newspaper Convention 2002  
 Newspaper of the Year (honorable mention) - Best of the Midwest College Newspaper Convention 2003  
 Sports Writing (2nd place) – Best of the Midwest College Newspaper Convention 2003 
 Best of Show (2nd place) – Best of the Midwest College Newspaper Convention 2004  
 Editorial Writing (honorable mention) – Best of the Midwest College Newspaper Convention 2004 
 Best of Show (Newspaper Excellence) – (2nd place) – National College Media Convention in Kansas City 2005
 Newspaper Adviser of the Year 2005 – Dr. Rey Rosales
 Best of Show (honorable mention) – Best of the Midwest College Newspaper Convention 2005  
 Sports Writing (1st place) – Best of the Midwest College Newspaper Convention 2005 
 Best of Show (1st place) – Best of the Midwest College Newspaper Convention 2006  
 Editorial Writing (honorable mention) – Best of the Midwest College Newspaper Convention 2006 
 News Photo (3rd place) – Best of the Midwest College Newspaper Convention 2006 
 Review Writing (honorable mention) – Best of the Midwest College Newspaper Convention 2006 
 Newspaper General Excellence Award (1st place)– Spring 2006 Associated Collegiate Press 'Best of the Midwest' Conference 
 The Pacemaker Award (National Award) – Fall 2007 Online Flyer  – Associated College Press
 Best of Show (1st place) –  Best of the Midwest College Newspaper Convention 2008   
 News Story (10th place) – Best of the Midwest College Newspaper Convention 2008 
 Newspaper General Excellence (1st place) – Spring 2008 Associated Collegiate Press 'Best of the Midwest' Conference 
 Newspaper General Excellence – Spring 2009 Associated Collegiate Press 'Best of the Midwest' Conference 
 Best of Show (1st place) –  Best of the Midwest College Newspaper Convention 2009  
 Single Page Design (4th place) –  Best of the Midwest College Newspaper Convention 2010  
 Best of Show (4th place) –  Best of the Midwest College Newspaper Convention 2011 
 Publication Website (4th place) –  Best of the Midwest College Newspaper Convention 2011 
 Multimedia Package (1st place) – Best of the Midwest College Newspaper Convention 2011  
 Social Media Main Page (2nd place) - College Media Association Best of Collegiate Design 2012  
 Feature Page (honorable mention) - College Media Association Best of Collegiate Design 2012 
 Best Facebook Page (3rd place) - Apple Awards 2012  
 Sports Story (honorable mention) - Best of the Midwest College Newspaper Convention 2012 
 Publication Website (9th place) - Best of the Midwest College Newspaper Convention 2012 
 Single Page Design (3rd place) -  Best of the Midwest College Newspaper Convention 2012  
 Website Enrollment Level I - 2012 ACP Best of Show Awards 
 Publication Website (1st place) - Best of the Midwest College Newspaper Convention 2013  
Single Page Design (4th place) - Best of the Midwest College Newspaper Convention 2013 
Social Media Main Page (second place) - College Media Association Best of Collegiate Design 2013
Feature Page (honorable mention) - College Media Association Best of Collegiate Design 2013
Best Facebook Page (3rd place) - Apple Awards 2013
Best Homepage (honorable mention) - Apple Awards 2013
General Excellence Award - ICPA Conference 2013
News Photo (second place) - ICPA Conference 2013
Photo Editor in the Non-Daily Newspaper Sports Photo (second place) - ICPA Conference 2013
Sports Page Design (third place) - ICPA Conference 2013
Advertisement (honorable mention) - ICPA Conference 2013
Sports Column (honorable mention) - ICPA Conference 2013
Overall News Website (1st place) - SSND Contest

See also

List of student newspapers

References

Student newspapers published in Illinois
Publications established in 1933
Lewis University
1933 establishments in Illinois